The Aminoff family is a Swedish-Finnish noble family of Russian origin ("Russian bayors").

Overview 
The family originated with boyars from Veliky Novgorod and hails from the clan of Ratsha, a court servant (tiun) to Prince Vsevolod II of Kiev. Later it split in two branches: the Russian and Nordic. The Russian Aminovs were a lineage of the Kuritsyn boyar family, who, in turn, were offspring of the Novgorodian Kamensky clan. The Russian branch is thought to be extinct. It is assumed that the family originates from Bohemia.

The Nordic branches and their members reside in Sweden and in Finland, and its genealogy branches are represented in Sweden's and Finland's Houses of Nobility.

Aminoff's is a traditional military family but in 1900s and 2000s they have been involved more in business and industry and as public servants. Aminoff noble family is still active, and it has plenty of family members in Sweden and in Finland.

Russian branch 

The Aminov family claimed their descent from the legendary Ratsha, who is also believed to be the progenitor of the Pushkins, Buturlins and other families. The Aminovs are actual descendants of the Kamensky family through boyar to Grand Duke Vasily I of Moscow Roman Ivanovich Kamensky, who owned the Kamenka of Bezhetsky uyezd, Veliky Novgorod. Roman Ivanovich was a descendant of Gavrila Alexich, boyar to Prince Alexander Nevsky, through which they are direct descendants of Ratsha. Ratsha's descendant Ivan Yuryevich (Volkov) syn Kurytsyn nicknamed Amin', the son of Yuri Ggirogyevich Kamensky nicknamed 'Volk' (i.e. wolf) is the actual progenitor of the family. Nikita Ivanovich Aminov took part in the siege of Kazan in 1552, where he was killed in action. The Russian branch died out in the 18th century.

Swedish branch 

The Swedish branch of the Aminoff family was introduced at the Swedish House of Nobility in 1650, No. 446. The Swedish branch was established in 1618 when The great-grandson of Nikita Aminov, Fyodor Grigoryevich Aminov ( – March 28, 1628), voivode at Ivangorod. In 1611, he surrendered the town to the Swedes and switched to their side. He moved to the Swedish territory with his immediate family. Soon he was appointed the governor of the Swedish Gdov. Teodor Gregorievitj Aminoff (Fyodor Grigoryevich Aminov) was then naturalized as a Swedish nobleman. Fyodor Aminov's mother was Princess Helena Ivanova Golitsin, daughter of Great Novgorod's Governor, Prince Ivan Jurivich Golitsin.

Finnish branch 

The Finnish branch of the Aminoff family, a subbranch of the Swedish branch, was introduced at the Finnish House of Nobility in the 1800s. The Finnish branch is reportedly seen as one of the biggest noble families of Finland, in terms of number of members, along with Schauman, Blåfield and Ehrnrooth. Prominent members of the Finnish branch include: Ivar Aminoff, Finnish Minister of Defense.

Notable members 

 Henrik Johan Aminoff (1680–1758), Lieutenant General
 Carl Mauritz Aminoff (1728–1798), Lieutenant General, Director of the Swedish Royal Army Pension Fund
 Adolf Aminoff (1733–1800), Major General and Commander of Savo Brigade
Johan Fredrik Aminoff (1756–1842), Count, General, Statesman
 Johan Gabriel Aminoff (1767–1828), Major General
 Gustaf Aminoff (1771–1836), Major General, Governor
 Adolf Aminoff (1806–1884), Count, General
 Berndt Adolf Carl Gregori (1809–1875), Colonel, Statesman
 Wilhelm Sixten Gregorius Aminoff (1838–1909), Chamberlain of Sweden's Queen Mother Josephine
 Johan Fredrik Gustaf Aminoff (1844–1899), Lieutenant General, Governor
 Adolf Petter Johannes Aminoff (1856–1938), Major General
Ivar Aminoff (1868–1931), Defense Minister of Finland, Politician
 Gregor Carl Georg Aminoff (1872–1934), Adjutant of King of Sweden Gustav V
 Alexis Aminoff (1897–1977), diplomat and Chamberlain of Duke and Duchess of Västergötland
Carl Göran Aminoff (1916–2001), CEO of Insurance Company Varma and Minister for Foreign Trade of Finland
Marianne Aminoff (1916–1984), a Swedish film actress
 Sten Gregor Aminoff (1918–2000), Ambassador of Sweden in New Zealand and Western Samoa

See also 

 Gregori Aminoff Prize

Gallery

References

Further reading

External links 

 Genealogy of the Aminoff family
 Aminoff at Riddarhuset.se
 Aminoff family website

 
Russian noble families
Swedish noble families
Finnish noble families